Thiru Aappanoor is a smaller temple lying in the shadow of the Meenakshi Amman Temple in the holy city of Madurai, India. The Pandya Kings and the Royal Sethupathi kings made many contributions to this temple. It is one of the shrines of the 275 Paadal Petra Sthalams.

Legend
 One day a wedge, or 'aappu', is said to have miraculously transformed into a shivalingam to allow the Pandya King Solandhagan to cross the flooded Vaigai River to reach the Meenakshi Amman Temple, and it is from this event that the Thiru Aappanoor temple takes its name. On another occasion, Shiva is also believed to have miraculously caused the sand of the river here to turn into rice during a famine.

Temple structure
The Pandya kings were the first to begin building the temple, which was further expanded by the Nayak kings. The shrine of the presiding deity, Lord Shiva faces east. A shrine to Subrahmanyar is situated between the shrines of Shiva and Ambal. Thus, the temple is said to be of the Somaskanda type. The Lord Hanuman is found on a pillar, and there is a fig tree (Ficus religiosa) in between the two shrines, with a vinayagar statue beneath it. This tree is considered to be a Shtala Virutcham or temple tree.

Sambandar composed the Tevaram Pathigam on Thiru Aappanoor.

Festivals
Bhrammotsavam is celebrated at Thiru Aappanoor for the Tamil month of Maasi. Navaratri is also celebrated at the temple. On the day of Panguni Uththiram, images of Meenakshi and Sundareswarar are brought to Thiru Aappanoor from the Meenakshi Amman temple across the river, and return on Rishabha Vaahanam. The festival idols at the temple are made of silver, and are taken in procession during the bimonthly Pradosham festival.

Transport links
Thiru Aappanoor is located in Sellur, part of Madurai city in Tamil Nadu. Town bus services run from Madurai Periyar bus stand, and the Simmakkal bus stop is also close by on the other side of the river.

References
thevaaram.org

External links
 http://www.templenet.com/Tamilnadu/s020.html
 http://www.shivatemples.com/pnaadu/pn02.html

Hindu temples in Madurai district
Tourist attractions in Madurai
Padal Petra Stalam